Kathryn A. Morrison (born 1959) is a British architectural historian, specialising in contemporary and Victorian urban architecture. She is joint head of the Historic Places Investigation with Historic England.

Education 
Kathryn A. Morrison attended the University of Edinburgh and the Courtauld Institute of Arts.

Career 
Morrison is joint Head of Historic Places Investigation with Historic England. Photographs contributed by Morrison to the Conway Library at the Courtauld Institute of Art are currently being digitised as part of the Courtauld Connects project.

Morrison served as Chairman-Director of the Society of Architectural Historians of Great Britain from 2009–2012. Morrison was Honorary Reviews Editor for the Journal for the Society of Architectural Historians in Great Britain in 2013–2014.

Awards and honours 
Morrison was elected fellow of the Society of Antiquaries of London in 1995. Morrison was awarded the Alice Davis Hitchcock Award by the Society of Architectural Historians of Great Britain in 2004 for English Shops and Shopping. Jessica Sewell notes that “The volume serves as a model for what can be learned from careful, in-depth observation of material culture in the form of the built environment [...] it provides readers with the tools to recognize the period and use of English shops from almost any era". Claire Walsh commented that the book is “...an impressive body of material, particularly the collection of illustrations which includes photographs of current retail outlets, of surviving shops and shop fronts from the medieval period onwards”.

With John Minnis, co-author, Morrison has been awarded many prizes for the Carscapes book:
 Peter Neaverson Award for Outstanding Scholarship awarded by the Association for Industrial Archaeology, 2014
 The Railway & Canal Historical Society's Transport Book of the Year Awards 2014
 It was also shortlisted for the 2014 Art Book Prize given by the Authors' Club and shortlisted by the Alice Davis Hitchcock 2014 Award sponsored by the Society of Architectural Historians of Great Britain.
Writing in Architectural Heritage journal, Neil Gregory noted that Carscapes is "a lavishly presented account that aims to document building types more often than not overlooked in general architecture histories".

Selected works

As author or co-author 
 The workhouse: a study of poor-law buildings in England, 1999, Royal Commission on the Historical Monuments of England. 
 English shops and shopping : an architectural history, 2004, Yale University Press 
 The Fever Wards, Stamford Hospital, Uffington Road, Stamford : historic buildings assessment,2015, Historic England.
 Woolworth's: 100 years on the high street, 2015, Historic England.
 Apethorpe: The Story of an English country house, edited by Kathryn A. Morrison. 2016, Yale University Press.
 Shopping parades, ed. P. Stamper, 2016, Historic England.
 Stewartby Brickworks, Stewartby, Bedfordshire: The Historical Significance of Stewartby Brickworks, 2018, Historic England.
 Carscapes: The Motor Car, Architecture and Landscapes in England, Kathryn A. Morrison and John Minnis, 2012, Yale University Press.
 Built to last?: The buildings of the Northamptonshire boot and shoe industry, with Ann Bond, 2015, English Heritage.
 Buildings and infrastructure for the motor car, John Minnis and Kathryn A. Morrison and edited by Paul Stamper, 2016, Historic England.
 One hundred years of suburbia: the Aldershot estate in Wanstead 1899-1999 / Kathryn Morrison and Anne Robey. 1999, Royal Commission on the Historical Monuments of England.

As contributor 

 The West Portal of Ivry-la-Bataille in ‘Medieval Architecture and its Intellectual Context. Studies in honour of Peter Kidson’, eds. Fernie, E & Crossley, P., A&C Black, 1990
 Curzon Street Station, New Canal Street, Birmingham / John Minnis, incorporating research by Emily Cole, Luke Jacob and Kathryn Morrison. 2015, Historic England.
 Historic England:Historic Places Investigation:  Cole, E and Morrison, K 2013 Red House (formerly Framlingham Workhouse), Framlingham Castle, Suffolk. Historic England Research Report 23/2016:
 Joint Head of Historic Places Investigation with Historic England researcher (2006-2018)

References 

Living people
English architectural historians
English art historians
Women art historians
Alumni of the University of York
Alumni of the Courtauld Institute of Art
1959 births
Place of birth missing (living people)
21st-century English women writers
21st-century English historians
British women historians
Fellows of the Society of Antiquaries of London